The Bangladesh Physical Society is a non-profit organization composed of physicists in Bangladesh which encourages physics research and education. It publishes the Bangladesh Journal of Physics.

History
The Bangladesh Physical Society proposed holding international events and conferences in 1995.

On 11 March 2020, Dr Mesbahuddin Ahmed, chairperson of the Bangladesh Accreditation Council, was elected president of the society and Dr Mohammed Nazrul Islam Khan, principal scientific officer of Bangladesh Atomic Energy Commission, was elected general secretary.

References

External links
 

Organisations based in Dhaka
Learned societies of Bangladesh
Research institutes in Bangladesh
Physics institutes